Travis Lane Little (born November 24, 1942) is a former state legislator in Mississippi.

He was born in Corinth, Mississippi. Little served in the Mississippi Senate as a Democrat from Corinth in the 1990s. He held the District 4 seat. Little was also President Pro Tempore of the Mississippi Senate and chaired the body's Rules Committee. He later changed party affiliations and joined the Republican Party.

References

Mississippi state senators
Mississippi Republicans
1942 births
Living people
Mississippi Democrats
20th-century American politicians
People from Corinth, Mississippi
21st-century American politicians